Manish R Goswami  (born 8 October 1961) is an Indian television producer and Chairman and Managing Director (CMD) of Siddhant Cinevision Private Limited. He is the founder of Siddhant Cinevision Limited and did debut as television producer with the Hindi Serial Parampara in 1993, which was telecasted on Zee TV and a popular serial among the viewers. Later he produced more than 35 TV serials like Aashirwad, Daraar, Kittie Party, Milan, Sarrkkar, Kaisa Yeh Ishq Hai...Ajab Sa Risk Hai etc. Those serials were telecasted on different Hindi entertainment TV Channels like DD-1, Zee TV, Star Plus, NDTV Imagine, SONY TV, Life Ok, SAHARA ONE etc.

Personal life
Manish R Goswami is the son of R. N. Goswami and Vimla R. Goswami. He is first cousin of versatile and legendary actor, producer and director of Bollywood Manoj Kumar. He graduated from Mumbai University and married Anuradha Goswami on 19 January 1987. He founded his production house Siddhant Cinevision Private Limited in 1993 and started his production journey with hit TV serial Parampara. Actress Neena Gupta recently released her autobiography 'Sach Kahu To' and narrated her television acting journey by mentioning producer Manish Goswami in that book. Responding to which Manish Goswami said, “Parampara was my first show as a producer on Zee and his first show on Satellite TV. It ran from 1993 to 1998. Whenever he needed advice on production-related activities, I used to guide him. She is a child at heart, passionate and hardworking.”

Career
Goswami hails from a respected film family, his late father produced the National Award film UPKAR released in 1967 and brother Manoj Kumar is famous actor, producer, and director. After Graduation (B.Com) from Mumbai University, Goswami joined his brother Manoj Kumar’s film company and worked as a Production Controller from 1987 to 1989. In 1990 he opened his own High Band Editing Studio & A Communication Center from 1990 to 1993, then he opened his own production company and produced his first show Parampara. Under his production house he has produced many TV serials, two Tele films and few TV Serials are in pre-production stage. Manish Goswami has registered the title of Hrishikesh Mukherjee's classic cult comedy film Chupke Chupke (1975) long ago, later while Bhushan’s company approached him he gave away the title with 'No Objection' letter as Bhushan Kumar and Luv Ranjan has already decided to remake the 1975 original. Further in 2019 he also gave the title to Ekta Kapoor for her comedy movie Dream Girl.

Social activity
Goswami has started a Preschool & Daycare center with his son Siddhant Goswami, on occasion of inauguration the iconic and legendary Cricketer Mr. Sunil Gavaskar and Film director Subhash Ghai was presented. Former Indian batsman Sunil Gavaskar and producer Manish Goswami have been close friends for more than two decades. Producer Manish Goswami is trying to convince her to face the camera in one of his upcoming productions. Manish Goswami (Vice President) will hand over 5,000 Covishield vaccines to FWICE (Federation of Western India Cine Employees). FWICE may vaccinate its members who may also ask their spouses to take the dose. 3.5 crores will be transferred among 7,000 salaried employees in trouble due to covid 19 through a private organization, for which FWICE thanked Manish Goswami for his cooperation. Manish Goswami shares memories related to Dilip Kumar on his death. Manish Goswami learned about Shagufta Ali health and financial plight and helped him financially for his better condition so that he could live well.

Manish Goswami was unanimously elected as the Vice-Chairman of The Producers Guild of India Limited for the 10th consecutive time in the first meeting of the Management Council held immediately after the 68th Annual General Meeting on 21 September 2022.

Television
The following is the list of Television shows produced by Manish R Goswami under his banner Siddhant Cinevision Private Limited. Note: television series in bold are the shows presently on air.

References

External links

 Siddhant Cinevision Pvt.Ltd.

1961 births
Indian television producers
Living people
Film producers from Mumbai
University of Mumbai alumni